Lizanne Henderson is a Senior Lecturer in history at the University of Glasgow in Dumfries.

Books 
Witchcraft and Folk Belief in the Age of Enlightenment: Scotland, c.1670-1740 Palgrave 2016. Winner of the Katharine Briggs Book Award 2016.
Editor, with Edward J. Cowan, A History of Everyday Life in Medieval Scotland Edinburgh: Edinburgh University Press, 2011.
Editor, Fantastical Imaginations: The Supernatural in Scottish History and Culture Edinburgh: John Donald, 2009.
with Edward J. Cowan, Scottish Fairy Belief: A History East Linton: Tuckwell P, 2001; 2007. 242pp. (Michaelis-Jena Ratcliffe Folklore Prize winner).

References

External links
 Staff web page
 Profile on Adventure Canada

20th-century births
Living people
Academics of the University of Glasgow
Cultural historians
21st-century Scottish historians
Scottish folklorists
Women folklorists
21st-century Scottish women writers
Year of birth missing (living people)
Scottish women academics
British women historians